Utsui Dam is an earthfill dam located in Yamaguchi prefecture in Japan. The dam is used for irrigation. The catchment area of the dam is 3.2 km2. The dam impounds about 12  ha of land when full and can store 1260 thousand cubic meters of water. The construction of the dam was started on 1975 and completed in 1990.

References

Dams in Yamaguchi Prefecture
1990 establishments in Japan